Famenne is a natural region in Wallonia (southern Belgium). Together with The Fagne or la Fagne, west of the river Meuse, it is part of the Fagne-Famenne natural region. The two regions are often grouped together because they are quite similar both geographically and naturally.

Etymology
The hypothesis that the name of the Famenne region may derive from Paemani, an ancient Germanic tribe, following the influence of the Germanic sound shift from p- to f-, is now considered doubtful by most scholars.

In the first medieval mentions, the Famenne is spelled in Latin in forms with an "l", for example Falmenna.

History

The oldest known definitions of the medieval version of the Condroz pagus also included the Famenne. Compared to the late medieval archdeaconries of Condroz and Fammene, the early medieval pagi did not include the deaneries of St Remacle, Hanret, or Chimay. Chimay had been part of the Lomme pagus, like most of the area between the Sambre and Meuse.

Geography

Natural geography
Famenne is mostly in the provinces of Namur and Luxembourg in Wallonia in southern Belgium. Its northeastern tip extends into the province of Liège. It is bounded on the west by the river Meuse, west of which lies Fagne, similar to Famenne both geographically and naturally. To the north of both lies the Condroz natural region. Famenne is at the western edge of the Ardennes mountain range.

Famenne is traversed by the Calestienne, a band of limestone resulting in calcium-rich soil and a corresponding concentration of calcicole plants. The rivers Lesse and Lomme cross the Calestienne, forming substantial cave systems. The caves of Han-sur-Lesse, the caves of Hotton and Rochefort's Lorette cave are the most notable examples.

Human geography
The most important city and unofficial capital of Famenne is Marche-en-Famenne. Other towns include Beauraing, Rochefort, Hotton and Durbuy.

Economy
The agriculture and forestry sectors are the main sources of employment in the region, although tourism also plays an important role.

References

Bibliography 

 

Natural regions of Belgium
Areas of Belgium
Forestry in Belgium
Wetlands of Belgium
Geographical, historical and cultural regions of France
Forestry in France
Wetlands of Metropolitan France
Regions of Wallonia
Landforms of Wallonia
Landforms of Liège Province
Landforms of Luxembourg (Belgium)
Landforms of Namur (province)
Landforms of Ardennes (department)
Marche-en-Famenne